FC Germanea is a Bulgarian football club based in Sapareva Banya. It was founded in 2008.

Current squad 
As of 2 July 2018

League positions

References 

Germanea